Chakrapani is a 1954 Indian Telugu-language comedy film, produced and directed by P. S. Ramakrishna Rao under the Bharani Pictures banner. It starsAkkineni Nageswara Rao with music composed by Bhanumathi.

Plot
Chakrapani (CSR) to whom money is the world but his family may call him a miser, has one goal in life – to save one lakh rupees by cutting down on whatever expenses he feels are avoidable. After his son's death, he takes care of his daughter-in-law Visalakshamma (Venkumamba), grandson Jagannadham (Chandrasekhar), and granddaughters Santha (T. G. Kamaladevi), Malati (Bhanumathi) and Revathy (Leelakumari). Among them, Malati is the naughtiest and plays pranks on her grandfather, taking digs at his miserly ways. She instigates her brother to pick up a row with the old man, which leads to Jagannadham's exit from the house. Not willing to spend much money on his granddaughters' weddings, Chakrapani gets an elderly widower Ananda Rao (Ramana Reddy) for Santha and a dumb fellow for Malati. On the day of the marriage, Malati leaves home and boards a train, while the meek Santha marries Ananda Rao and takes her younger sister Revathy along with her. On the train, Malati meets a considerate couple, Mukunda Rao (Dr. Sivaramakrishnayya), a veterinary doctor, and his wife Usha (Chayadevi). They take her home and Usha's brother Venkatachalam (Akkineni Nageswara Rao) falls in love with her. Malati agrees to marry him and the wedding is performed. Mukunda Rao gets a transfer and leaves the town. Malati lets a portion of the house to Manorama (Suryakantham). Venkatachalam joins an insurance company that requires him to travel frequently.

Meanwhile, Chakrapani reaches his target of saving one lakh rupees and decides to give it to his great-grandson. Revathy conveys this to Malati and also informs her that Santha is pregnant. Ananda Rao hopes that she will deliver a boy, but Santha gives birth to a girl. On the advice of Manorama (Suryakantham), Malati, to get hold of the property, writes to her grandfather that she has delivered a boy. Chakrapani arrives to see the child. Chalam was on an official tour at that time. Manorama brings a child from the opposite house and the boy was shown to Chakrapani as Malati's son. To bring authenticity to the drama, Manorama's brother Saradhi (Amarnath) is made to act as Malati's husband, Chalam. On the same day, Chalam too returns from his tour and was introduced to Chakrapani as the cook. And from there on the story takes several comic twists and turns and ultimately Chakrapani is elated that the money is going to the rightful heir- his great-grandson, who happens to be none other than the son of his estranged grandson, Jagannatham. But Jagannadham declares that women have equal property rights and that he will share the money with his sisters.

Cast
Bhanumathi Ramakrishna as Malati
Akkineni Nageswara Rao as Venkatachalam
C. S. R as Chakrapani
Ramana Reddy as Ananda Rao
Amarnath as Saradhi
Dr. Sivaramakrishnayya as Mukunda Rao
Chandrasekhar as Jagannadham
Vangara as Kotayya
Allu Ramalingaiah as Priest
Suryakantham (actress) as Manorama
Chayadevi as Usha 
T. G. Kamala Devi as Shantha

Soundtrack

Music was composed by Bhanumathi. Lyrics were written by Ravuri Satyanarayana Rao. Music released on H. M. V. Audio Company.

Production 
A popular writer of the time, Ravuru had started his career with Krishnapatrika in Machilipatnam and later worked in the editorial section of Andhra Prabha. His column Ashamaashi, in which he wrote on serious subjects in a lighter vein, was very popular in those days. He came up with the story of Chakrapani, a penny-pincher, and his naughty granddaughter. This film was a satire on Tollywood veteran producer Chakrapani. Due to her rift with Chakrapani, Bhanumathi had left the lead role in the movie Missamma and later that role went to Savitri. By that time she was in the making of the film Vipranarayana (1954), in which ANR and Bhanumathi are playing lead roles. She postponed the shooting of Vipranarayana and began to work on this film and wanted to release the film before the release of Missamma. It is the debut movie of Bhanumathi as Music Director.

Critical reception 
An article published in The Hindu newspaper on the movie reviewed: " The entire narrative in the movie is full of wit, thanks to Ravuru's humorous dialogue and the fine performance by all major actors – ANR, Bhanumathi, CSR, Kamaladevi, Amarnath, Ramana Reddy, Suryakantham and others. As usual, Bhanumathi dominated the proceedings and came up with a career-best hilarious show, sustaining with ease the tempo throughout. ANR matched her with his comic timing and expressions. Apart from performances, excellent cinematography by P. S. Selvaraj, the musical score by Bhanumathi helped the film's box-office success. Her renditions – "Uyyala Jampalalooga Raavaya…," "Pakkala Nilabadi…," "Nanu Choosi Intha Jaali Yelanamma," and A. M. Raja's "O Priyuraala… O Jawaraala" needs mention. Addepalli Ramarao and the popular violinist of the time, Hari Achyutharama Sastry, provided the background score that enhanced the film's quality."

Legacy 
When Bhanumathi reworked the story and made it as Athagaru Zindabad (director: P. Chandrasekhar Reddy) in 1988 as a tribute to her husband, her attempt did not meet with similar success.

References

External links 
 

1954 films
1950s Telugu-language films
Films directed by P. S. Ramakrishna Rao
Indian comedy-drama films
1954 comedy-drama films
Indian black-and-white films
Films scored by P. Bhanumathi